Death Race: Beyond Anarchy is a 2018 American science fiction action film directed by Don Michael Paul. It is the fourth and final film in the Death Race remake series and a direct sequel to the 2008 film Death Race. The film was released on DVD and digitally on October 2, 2018.

Plot

A privatized security firm runs the Sprawl, a massive prison housing around 420,000 inmates.  Inside, the popular Death Race competition (a last-man-standing competition where inmates race modified cars armed with heavy weapons) has been made illegal by the new warden who was hired by the prison's owner, Weyland International.  He has been tasked with taking out Frankenstein, the prison's Death Race champion and king.

After defeating a competitor in a Death Race, Frankenstein arrives at an afterparty.  A prison SWAT team attempts to take him out.  They kill several convicts in the area but are eventually cornered and butchered by Frankenstein's loyal inmate army.  Frankenstein speaks to the warden through one of their body cameras, saying that he will kill every man the warden sends to kill him.  The warden is admonished by his boss, a Weyland International executive, for failing to kill Frankenstein, and warns him that he has one last chance.

A helicopter of new prisoners flies over the Sprawl and a guard explains the rules of the land.  They are each given a roll of silver coins to help make their way in the prison.  Immediately upon landing, "the Cops," a prison gang run by Death Racer Johnny Law, come upon the new inmates and kill most of them.  Two survive but refuse to hand over their coins.  They defeat the entire gang, demonstrating unusually skillful technique, and go their separate ways.

The male inmate, Connor, is picked up by a group of women who see his impressive fight.  He tells them he is looking for Baltimore Bob, a name he overheard while on the helicopter, who supposedly runs the Death Races.  They take him to a bar run by Frankenstein, where Johnny Law is about to be killed for failing to get all the coins from the new inmates.  Connor defeats two more of Frankenstein's henchmen and Frankenstein confronts him personally.  Though they do not fight, Connor shows no fear or respect for Frankenstein in their exchange.  The bartender, Jane, connects Connor with Baltimore Bob who also witnessed his fight.

Baltimore Bob takes Connor around the prison and they discuss the Death Races.  They attend a qualifying match for the Death Race at the Death Pit, where riders on motorcycles must avoid obstacles and traps in order to survive.  The other inmate who fought the Cops upon landing, Gipsy Rose, wins the qualifying match.  That night, Jane once again sees Connor and brings him to her house.  They talk about how they got into the Sprawl.  She assumes he wishes to sleep with her, but Connor refuses to her surprise.

The next day, Connor tells Baltimore Bob that he wants to be in a Death Race.  His qualifying match is a footrace to a tower, which he must climb to claim the keys to a car.  He fights his way to the tower and gets the keys, only to find that now he must face the Butcher, a huge man carrying a sledgehammer and sickle.  Connor gruesomely defeats him and Frankenstein tells his concubine Carley to bring Connor to him.  In the shower, Carley makes a pass at Connor, which he again refuses.  Frankenstein tells him that if he wins the Death Race, he will become king of the Sprawl, and asks if he is ready for that responsibility.  After the meeting, Connor goes to see Jane again.  This time, they appear to begin a relationship.

Connor begins construction of his Death Racer with Baltimore Bob.  The woman who picked him up after his fight with the Cops asks to be his co-pilot, to which he reluctantly agrees.  He spends the night before the Death Race with Jane again, telling her that before he got to prison, he had nothing to care about, and implies that now he cares only for her.

The next morning, he sees the entire prison descending on Jane's house.  He goes outside and is confronted by Frankenstein, who reveals to the whole prison that Connor is actually Sergeant Connor Gibson, a special operative sent inside to kill him.  He declares that Connor will be allowed to compete in the Death Race, but many are angered by this betrayal and wish him dead.

As the Death Racers arrive at the starting line, Frankenstein reveals that his new co-pilot will be a captive Jane, whom he is using as an "insurance policy" against Connor.  Throughout the Death Race, competitors are taken out one by one, until only Connor, Frankenstein, Johnny Law and Gipsy Rose remain.  Connor, in last, gets rerouted by Baltimore Bob.  He performs a near impossible jump of 250 feet over a downed bridge and gets right back behind Frankenstein.  Johnny Law is eliminated and Gipsy Rose is in third.

During the final stretch, Connor runs out of gas.  Frankenstein turns around and Jane begs him not to kill Connor.  Frankenstein drives at Connor and his co-pilot; they fire a missile at him with no effect.  At the last second, Gipsy Rose T-bones Frankenstein.  Connor rushes to help Jane and Gipsy Rose gets out and shoots Frankenstein, killing him.  She tells Connor that a helicopter will be there to pick them up soon; he realizes that she is also a special agent.  Connor, now torn between his past life and his new one with Jane, decides to stay.  Baltimore Bob tells him to put on the mask, become Frankenstein and run the Sprawl.  He takes Frankenstein's coat and mask, wins the Death Race and presumably stays at the Sprawl.

Cast

Release
The film was originally scheduled to be released on January 30, 2018, but was pushed back to October 2.

References

External links
 
 

Death Race (franchise)
2018 direct-to-video films
2010s English-language films
Direct-to-video sequel films
2018 science fiction action films
American science fiction action films
Universal Pictures direct-to-video films
American chase films
American dystopian films
2010s road movies
American road movies
Films directed by Don Michael Paul
Films scored by Frederik Wiedmann
Films produced by Mike Elliott
Films with screenplays by Paul W. S. Anderson
2010s American films